TWA Flight 841 was a scheduled passenger flight from John F. Kennedy International Airport in New York City, en route to Minneapolis-Saint Paul International Airport in Minneapolis, Minnesota. On April 4, 1979, at or around 9:48 p.m. Eastern Standard Time (01:48 UTC), while flying over Saginaw, Michigan, the Boeing 727-31 airliner began a sharp, uncommanded roll to the right, and subsequently went into a spiral dive. The pilots were able to regain control of the aircraft and made a successful emergency landing at Detroit Metropolitan Airport.

Incident
At 8:25p.m. EST, TWA Flight 841 departed JFK International after a 45-minute delay due to traffic congestion and reached its initial cruising altitude of 35,000feet at 8:54p.m. Due to a  headwind, the pilots requested to climb to 39,000feet at 9:25p.m., which was granted. He saw the plane's nose yaw to the right, pause and then yaw right again. He looked at his instruments and saw the plane banking right with the autopilot moving the control wheel to the left to level the wings. This had no effect so Gibson disconnected the autopilot and applied full left aileron which had no effect. He got on the rudder pedals to apply full left rudder. He would state that as he did so he felt something didn't feel right with the rudder but didn't know what it was. Captain Gibson's inputs had no effect as the plane very quickly began a steep roll to the right. Gibson shouted "Get em' up!" referring to the co-pilot to deploy the speed brakes, but the co-pilot didn't understand what the Captain meant so Gibson deployed them. Despite the best efforts of the flight crew, the aircraft spiraled out of control; Gibson shouted, "We're going over!". During the course of the dive, the plane rolled through 360degrees twice and exceeded the Mach limit for the 727 airframe. During the dive, Captain Gibson got so desperate to save the plane that he began moving his control column from all the way left to all the way right, then all the way forward and all the way back, full left rudder, then full right rudder, and retracted and extended the speedbrakes, but his efforts were fruitless.

At about  the pilots extended the landing gear in an attempt to slow the aircraft. A few seconds after extending the gear, Captain Gibson managed to regain control and pull the 727 out of its dive, and at about  the nose finally came up again. The plane suffered substantial structural damage with the System A hydraulics ruptured as a result of the right main landing gear overextending and the Flight Engineer reported they had a fail flag for the lower rudder yaw damper but made an emergency landing at Detroit Metropolitan Airport in Michigan at 10:31p.m. EST without further trouble. No fatalities occurred among the 82passengers and 7crew members. Eight passengers reported minor injuries related to high .

Investigation
The National Transportation Safety Board (NTSB) investigated the accident, conducting what was at the time the lengthiest accident investigation in NTSB history. In its final report, published in June 1981, the NTSB concluded the probable cause of the accident was a mechanical failure of a leading-edge slat under inappropriate manipulation and the captain's untimely action.

Among the damage discovered after the accident, investigators found the #7 slat missing from the leading edge of the right wing. NTSB investigators requested the aircraft manufacturer, Boeing, inspect the remainder of the slat assembly, including a portion of the slat actuator cylinder (the motor that moves the slat and holds it in position). Boeing determined that the #7 slat had failed because the slats had been extended while the aircraft was flying at cruising speed. They also determined that it was "impossible" for the flaps to extend without manipulating the controls.

After eliminating all individual and combined sources of mechanical failure, the NTSB ruled that the extension of the slats was due to the flight crew manipulating the flap/slat controls in an inappropriate manner. Investigators believed that 727 pilots (in general, and this flight specifically) were setting the trailing edge flaps to two degrees during high altitude cruise, while at the same time pulling the circuit breaker for the slats so that they would not activate. This configuration was rumored to result in increased lift with no increase in drag, thus allowing more speed, higher elevation, or decreased fuel consumption. Flaps and slats were intended to only be deployed at low speeds during take-off or landing.

The crew, Capt. Harvey G. "Hoot" Gibson (1934-2015), first officer J. Scott Kennedy (1939-2017), and flight engineer Gary N. Banks (born 1942), denied that their actions had been the cause of the flaps' extension: 

The crew suggested instead that an actuator on the #7 slat had failed, causing its inadvertent deployment. The NTSB rejected this as improbable and attributed the extension of the flaps to the deliberate actions of the crew. The crew claimed that such failures had happened on other 727s prior and subsequent to this incident. The NTSB report noted that between 1970 and 1973, seven separate cases involving a single leading edge slat extension and separation were reported, but none of these reports indicated whether or not the slat extension was due to flight crew involvement. Records after 1974 did include this information, and (other than Flight 174) only two slat extension problems were reported between 1974 and the close of the NTSB's investigation in 1981, one of which was inadvertently caused by the flight crew. However, in none of these previous cases did the plane become uncontrollable.

The flight crew testified that they had not engaged the flaps, and the NTSB concluded that "if the flightcrew's recollections are accurate," the slat extension must have been caused by a mechanical failure or defect. However, the NTSB ultimately concluded that the flight crew was probably attempting to use 2º of flaps at cruising speed:

When retraction of the flaps was ordered, the Number 7 leading edge slat failed to retract, causing the uncommanded roll to the right.

 
Gibson appealed against the NTSB's findings, first to the NTSB itself and then to the U.S. Ninth Circuit Court of Appeals. Both petitions were rejected: the former for lack of new evidence, and the latter for lack of jurisdiction due to the NTSB's "unreviewable discretion".

The aircraft was repaired and returned to service in May 1979.

Cockpit voice recorder

The aircraft was equipped with a Fairchild Industries Model A-100 cockpit voice recorder (CVR). However, 21 minutes of the 30-minute tape were blank. Tests of the CVR in the aircraft revealed no discrepancies in the CVR's electrical and recording systems (the NTSB was erroneously told by someone at TWA that there were no faults with the CVR when no tests were ever carried out).The CVR tape can be erased by means of the bulk-erase feature on the CVR control panel located in the cockpit. This feature can be activated only after the aircraft is on the ground with its parking brake engaged. In 1979 it was essentially a standard procedure at the end of every flight to erase the CVR if the flight was routine for privacy reasons. In a deposition taken by the Safety Board, the captain stated that he usually activates the bulk-erase feature on the CVR at the conclusion of each flight to preclude inappropriate use of recorded conversations. However, in this instance, he could not recall having done so. The NTSB made the following statement in the accident report:

Criticism of investigation
In the book Emergency: Crisis In the Cockpit, Stanley Stewart, a professional pilot, raised questions about the NTSB findings:
Stewart suggests that the crew would not have been able to erase the CVR as the aircraft had to be completely shut down and on the ground. According to Stewart, the damage should have meant that the computers did not recognize the aircraft in a fully landed state (page 217). 
He suggests that there were other incidents of 727-200s with uncommanded slat extensions in the years prior to and after the accident (page 224).
The flight crew knew the aircraft was potentially unstable at 39,000 ft. Stewart believes it would be unlikely they would "fool around" with the controls and risk the stability of the aircraft (page 221).

Trans World Airlines and Air Line Pilots Association (ALPA) investigators contend that once the NTSB investigators discovered that 21 minutes of the Cockpit Voice Recorder were blank, instead inspecting it for any deficiencies or ever considering the possibility that it wasn't working properly they quickly concluded the pilots had erased it and developed their own preconceived notion that the pilots had caused the upset instead of letting the evidence lead them to a conclusion. They conducted the investigation with the flight crew's sworn testimonies discounted and elected not to further question them about the events leading up to the upset. The NTSB's conclusions were based on what their biased opinion on what they believed had happened, even though it bore no resemblance to the flight crew or passengers' version of events. 

In 1990, ALPA sent a petition to the NTSB to reconsider their findings after discovering the investigators made serious investigative errors during the investigation. ALPA concluded the No. 7 slat did not cause the upset and instead ripped off as a result of the upset. They stated evidence best supported that while cruising at 39,000 feet, the bolt to the outboard right aileron on TWA flight 841 fractured, causing the aileron to flutter and create the high frequency vibration Captain Hoot Gibson reported. As the aileron floated up, the plane banked to the right and turned off its heading, the autopilot tried to correct for this by moving the control wheel left. Once the control wheel turned more than 10°, the spoilers on the left wing deployed to aid in roll control, creating the buzzing sound. With the plane turning right and the autopilot commanding a left turn, the 727 was in a cross-controlled position. The yaw damper rate gyro and or coupler sensed discrepant rudder inputs which resulted in the lower rudder going into the hardover position, causing the plane to yaw severely right. In this condition the left wing produced more lift as a result; on sweptback planes like the 727, a large sideslip angle produces a large rolling moment. Although Hoot disconnected the autopilot and applied opposite aileron and upper rudder, with the lower rudder in the hardover position and limited roll control due to the right outboard aileron free-floating, his control inputs were insufficient to prevent TWA 841 from going into an uncontrollable spiral dive. When the crew lowered the landing gear, the over extension of the right main landing gear ruptured System A hydraulics which centered the rudder and allowed the pilots to recover from the dive. The No. 7 slat showed a lack of wear and was misaligned, meaning that it was held in place only by hydraulic pressure and aerodynamic forces. With the loss of hydraulics, the slat extended at 8,000 feet and ripped off almost immediately. Analysis of the No. 7 slat by the NTSB showed a lack of wear, was misaligned, and didn't lock into its locking mechanism, meaning that it was held in place only by hydraulic pressure and aerodynamic forces. With the loss of hydraulics, the slat extended at 8,000 feet and quickly ripped off. The other slats stayed retracted because they locked into their locking mechanisms. 

Professional pilot and author, Emilio Corsetti III, stated in his book Scapegoat: A Flight Crew's Journey From Heroes to Villains to Redemption,  that the Boeing engineers and NTSB investigators massaged the data to make it match their version of events, not the flight crew's version of events (page 192); and "had the NTSB not let the supposed erasure of the CVR implant a bias on the investigation, they might have considered possibilities other than crew involvement. They might have talked to the crew in greater detail and would have learned that the plane yawed before the upset" (page 384).

In media
This incident was the subject of a 44-minute CBS News Special titled "The Plane That Fell From The Sky". The special won a Peabody Award in 1983.

The incident was featured on season 22 of the Canadian documentary series Mayday, in the episode titled "Terror over Michigan".

See also
 China Airlines Flight 006 - Another case where a Boeing aircraft entered an uncontrolled nose-dive
 China Eastern Airlines Flight 583 — Another slat extension in-flight accident

References

External links

NTSB Synopsis
U.S. Ninth Circuit Court of Appeals, GIBSON v NTSB (appeal dismissed--lack of jurisdiction)

841
Aviation accidents and incidents in the United States in 1979
Accidents and incidents involving the Boeing 727
Airliner accidents and incidents in Michigan
Disasters in Michigan
1979 in Michigan
April 1979 events in the United States